The 1978 Asian Invitational Badminton Championships which was the third edition of Asian Invitational Championships took place in the month of April in Peking, People's Republic of China.

Description 
This Asian tourney was originally decided to be held in Singapore but was later given to China. Tournament organised junior events as well which included Boys' singles & doubles as well as Girls' singles and doubles. Mixed doubles competitions were as usual not conducted. A total of 12 countries took part in this event which were China, India, Singapore, Iran, Japan, Malaysia, Indonesia, Hong Kong, Philippines, Thailand, Sri Lanka and Pakistan. 

At the end of day, China won all the disciplines except Women's doubles doubles which was won by Thailand. Gold medals for Junior events were shared between Amy Chan of Hong Kong who won Girls' singles event, He Shangquan of China who won Boys' singles, Tay Hoe See & Judy Lee of Singapore who won Girls' doubles and the combination of Maung Maung & Win Mar of Burma who won the Boys' doubles discipline.

Medalists

Men's singles

Women's singles

Men's doubles

Women's doubles 
Bronze medal winners unknown

References 

Badminton Asia Championships
Asian Badminton Championships
1978 Badminton Asia Championships
Badminton Asia Championships
Badminton Asia Championships